The County of Carlisle is a county (a cadastral division) in Queensland, Australia. The county is centred on the city of Mackay and includes most of the Mackay Region. It takes its name from Carlisle in England.

On 7 March 1901, the Governor issued a proclamation legally dividing Queensland into counties under the Land Act 1897. Its schedule described Carlisle thus:

Parishes 
Carlisle is divided into parishes, as listed below:

See also
 Lands administrative divisions of Queensland

References

External links 

 
 

Carlisle